Robert W. Spekkens is a Canadian theoretical quantum physicist working in the fields of quantum foundations and quantum information.

He is known for his work on epistemic view of quantum states (in particular the Spekkens toy model), quantum contextuality, quantum resource theories and quantum causality. 

He co-edited the book Quantum Theory: Informational Foundations and Foils.

Career 
Spekkens is a faculty member and the leader of the quantum causal inference initiative at Perimeter Institute for Theoretical Physics. He regularly teaches the course on quantum foundations in the Perimeter Scholars International master's program.

He is an adjunct faculty in the Department of Physics of the University of Waterloo and an adjunct research fellow in the Centre for Quantum Dynamics of Griffith University in Brisbane, Australia.

Awards 

 2012 FQXI Essay contest "Questioning the Foundations: Which of Our Assumptions Are Wrong?"

References 

Year of birth missing (living people)
Living people
Quantum physicists
21st-century Canadian physicists
University of Toronto alumni
McGill University alumni